Someone from the Past is a 1958 detective novel by the Scottish author Margot Bennett.

Premise
The novel's narrator, Nancy, meets up with an old friend, Sarah, in a restaurant one night. The next morning, Nancy learns that Sarah has been murdered. After inciting the suspicions of the police, Nancy comes to the conclusion that any of Sarah's four previous romantic interests could have performed the murder, and sets out to find which it could be.

Reception
The Saturday Review published a review of the book on 20 December 1958, writing 'action unfrantic, dialogue abundant but sprightly'. The novel won the Gold Dagger Award in 1958.

Republication
The novel was reissued in 2002, having been out of print for some years prior to this, but is no longer produced.

References

1958 British novels
British mystery novels
British detective novels
Novels by Margot Bennett
Eyre & Spottiswoode books